Newman University is a private Roman Catholic university in Wichita, Kansas. It is named for John Henry Newman and was founded by the Adorers of the Blood of Christ in 1933.

History

The college was founded in 1933 by the Adorers of the Blood of Christ as Sacred Heart Junior College. Courses were offered for women only, initially offering degrees in home economics, nursing, teaching, and secretarial science. The college added more facilities and courses during the 1950s and began accepting male students on a limited basis in 1959. The school became fully coeducational in 1965 and was accredited by the North Central Association of Colleges and Secondary schools in 1967. The name of the school was changed to Kansas Newman College in 1973 and to Newman University in 1998. The school is named in honor of Saint John Henry Newman.

Presidents

Campus
The main buildings of Newman University are all dedicated to someone important in Newman's history.

The Fine Arts Center is named after Maria De Mattias, the founder of the Adorers of the Blood of Christ. Maria taught herself to write and subsequently taught those from her local area who could not afford an education. Other figures from the history of the university have also had buildings named after them at Newman, such as Monsignor Leon A. McNeill, who was the first president of Newman as a college.

In 2010 Newman University began construction on the Bishop Gerber Science Center which now houses state-of-the-art science labs and classrooms. The project was completed in 2017.

The Gymnasium is named after the O’Shaughnessy family which has made generous donations towards Newman and were the lead donors for the athletic department. The family also supports scholarships and other buildings around campus such as De Mattias Fine Arts Hall.

The Dugan Library and conference center was named after John E. and Marilyn K. Dugan of Wichita for their donation of $2 million after the previous library was demolished.

Student life

Admissions ambassadors
These students dedicate their time to touring campus with potential students. Those who visit to learn more about the university will interact with ambassadors for a large portion of their visit.

Clubs and organizations
Newman University has more than 30 active clubs and organizations ranging from The Multicultural Leadership Organization to a Disc Golf Club. Many students are inducted into nationally recognized academic organizations such as Pi Gamma Mu.

These communities provide opportunities for students to develop their leadership, promote awareness of issues, expand professional and personal competencies, and engage with Newman University and local communities outside of the classroom.

Resident assistant
Resident Assistants (RAs) are individuals who make sure that students living in the residence halls are abiding by the rules of Newman University. RAs also make sure to interact with their residents and organize events throughout the year to help strengthen the residence hall community. The residence halls are listed below:

Carrocci Hall
Beata Hall
Merlini Hall
Fugate Hall

Student government association
The Student Government Association (SGA) represents the whole student population at Newman University. Their main focus is to find ways in which to better the experience of students while they attend Newman University.

Campus Ministry
Campus Ministry hosts faith-based events throughout the year with the help of campus ministers and student volunteers. Along with a daily Mass, the organization hosts events such as bible studies, liturgical lunches, game nights, and service trips.

Service scholars
Many of the scholarships awarded at Newman have an annual community service requirement. The three main scholarships awarded with these requirements are ASC Community Leader, Saint Newman, and the Presidential Scholarship.

Scholarships
At Newman, the Saint Newman Scholarship is the highest academic award offered. The requirements include: 4.0 high school GPA, 30+ ACT, 64 community service hours annually, and 3.4 cumulative GPA while at Newman.

The Presidential Scholarship is $12,000 annually and awarded for high academic achievement. The requirements include: 3.8-3.9 high school GPA, 28-29 ACT, 64 community service hours annually, and must maintain 3.25 cumulative GPA while at Newman.

The ASC Community Leader Scholarship is working to keep the mission of Newman and the mission of the founders, the Adorers of the Blood of Christ, strong in the Newman community. ASC scholars participate in service and leadership classes as well as complete 90 hours of community service. The requirements include: 3.0 high school GPA, outstanding community service, interview, 90 hours community service annually, 4 years of service classes. Seniors are required to organize a Capstone project that consist of 45 hours (from the 90 hours) of community service.

Athletics

The Newman athletic teams are called the Jets. The university is a member of the Division II level of the National Collegiate Athletic Association (NCAA), primarily competing in the Mid-America Intercollegiate Athletics Association (MIAA) for most of its sports as an associate member since the 2019–20 academic year (before achieving full member status in 2022–23); while its men's soccer team competes in the Great American Conference (GAC). The Jets previously competed in the D-II Heartland Conference from 2006–07 to 2018–19; and in the defunct Midlands Collegiate Athletic Conference (MCAC) of the National Association of Intercollegiate Athletics (NAIA) from 1999–2000 to 2005–06.

Newman competes in 19 intercollegiate varsity sports: Men's sports include baseball, basketball, bowling, cross country, golf, soccer, tennis, triathlon and wrestling; while women's sports include basketball, bowling, cheer & dance, cross country, golf, soccer, softball, tennis, triathlon and volleyball.

Mascot
Newman University introduced their new mascot, “Johnny Jet” in September 2010.

Notable people

Alumni
Dax (1994- ), rapper 
 Alex Ciabattoni (1994- ), basketball forward
 Tony Fulton (1972- ), Nebraska state legislator
 Issoufou Idrissa (1976- ), Nigerien soccer striker
 Tom Malone (1953- ), Kansas Court of Appeals judge
 Rick Roder, baseball umpire, author
 Clare Vanderpool (1965- ), children's book author
 Ponka-We Victors (1981- ), Kansas state legislator

Faculty and staff
 Robert Beattie, lawyer, crime writer
 Cliff Brown (1956- ), soccer coach
 Naomi Hirahara (1962- ), novelist, editor

References

External links
 
 Newman Athletics website

 
Education in Wichita, Kansas
Educational institutions established in 1902
Educational institutions established in 1958
Educational institutions established in 1998
Buildings and structures in Wichita, Kansas
1958 establishments in Kansas
1932 establishments in Kansas
Catholic universities and colleges in Kansas
Association of Catholic Colleges and Universities
Roman Catholic Diocese of Wichita